Morlaix station (French: Gare de Morlaix) is a railway station serving the town Morlaix, Finistère department, western France. It is situated on the Paris–Brest railway and the branch to Roscoff.

Services

The station is served by high speed trains to Brest and Paris, and regional trains to Brest, Lannion and Rennes.

References

Railway stations in Finistère
TER Bretagne
Railway stations in France opened in 1865